Séamus Aloysius Burke (sometimes spelt Bourke) (15 June 1893 – 10 June 1967) was an Irish barrister and Cumann na nGaedheal and later Fine Gael politician who was a Teachta Dála (TD) from 1918 to 1938, and served as Parliamentary Secretary to the Minister for Finance (1927–1932) and Minister for Local Government and Public Health (1924–1927).

Career
He was first elected to Dáil Éireann at the 1918 general election as a Sinn Féin TD for Tipperary Mid. He supported the Anglo-Irish Treaty in 1921 and went on to become a founder-member of Cumann na nGaedheal and later Fine Gael. Burke served in the governments of W. T. Cosgrave in the 1920s. He lost his seat at the 1938 general election and after unsuccessfully standing again as an independent at the 1943 general election, he retired from politics and moved to England. He was also a barrister.

Family
In 1929, Burke married the Russian, Zenaide Bashkiroff, and they had one daughter.

Arms

References

 

1893 births
1967 deaths
Cumann na nGaedheal TDs
Fine Gael TDs
Independent politicians in Ireland
Members of the 1st Dáil
Members of the 2nd Dáil
Members of the 3rd Dáil
Members of the 4th Dáil
Members of the 5th Dáil
Members of the 6th Dáil
Members of the 7th Dáil
Members of the 8th Dáil
Members of the 9th Dáil
Members of the Parliament of the United Kingdom for County Tipperary constituencies (1801–1922)
UK MPs 1918–1922
Early Sinn Féin TDs
Parliamentary Secretaries of the 6th Dáil
Parliamentary Secretaries of the 5th Dáil
People of the Irish Civil War (Pro-Treaty side)
Alumni of Trinity College Dublin
Alumni of King's Inns
People educated at Clongowes Wood College